{{Infobox person
| name        = Sandra Nelson
| image       = 
| birth_name  = 
| birth_date  = 
| birth_place = Madison, Wisconsin, United States
| death_date  = 
| known_for   = 'The Young and the RestlessThe Wolf of Wall Street| occupation  = Actress
| years_active = 1990-present
| spouse      = 
| partner     = 
| children    = Maya, Sebastian 
| parents     = 
| website     = 
| other_names = Sandra Nelson Winkler
| awards      = 
}}
Sandra Nelson Winkler (born December 29, 1964), more commonly credited as Sandra Nelson, is an American actress. She was born in Madison, Wisconsin, and is best known for her role as Phyllis Summers on The Young and the Restless that she played from 1997 to 1999. Nelson also played Aliyah Farran in The Wolf of Wall Street.

Personal life
Nelson married television and film director and producer Charles Winkler on September 6, 1998. The couple divorced in 2012.Charles Winkler The Outer Limits, Directors They have a daughter, born in 2000 and a son born in 2002. 

Select filmography
Nelson's other credits include guest roles:Highlander: The Series as Elaine Trent (Episode: "Avenging Angel") (1993)Star Trek: Deep Space Nine as Tavana (Episode: "Soldiers of the Empire") (1997)Star Trek: Voyager as Marayna (Episode: "Alter Ego") (1997)ER as Michelle (Episode: "Makemba") (2003)Monk as Dr. Jackman (Episode: "Mr. Monk Can't See a Thing") (2006)Without a Trace as Stephanie Healy (Episode: "Transitions") (2005)Just Legal (1 episode) (2006)Reality'' as Isabella (2014)

References

External links

American television actresses
American soap opera actresses
Living people
Actors from Madison, Wisconsin
Actresses from Wisconsin
1964 births
American film actresses
20th-century American actresses
21st-century American actresses